was a fudai feudal domain of Edo period Japan. It was located in Mino Province, in central Honshū. The domain was centered at Takatomi jin'ya, located in what is now the city of Yamagata in Gifu Prefecture.

History
Takatomi Domain was created by Shōgun Tokugawa Tsunayoshi for Honjō Michiaki, the grandson of Honjō Michimasa, who was step-brother to his birth-mother Keishōin in 1705. It was originally called .

The domain had an assigned kokudaka of 10,000 koku. The jin’ya was transferred to Takatomi in 1709. Honjō Michimasa did not reside in the domain, but remained mostly in Edo Castle. Although his domain was very small, Honjō Michimasa and his successors were assigned many tasks pertaining to placating the kuge nobility in Kyoto, and the domain's revenues were not commensurate with this task. As a result, by the time of the 8th daimyō the domain was very deeply in debt. The 9th daimyō, Honjō Michitsura, attempted fiscal reforms, including fiscal frugality, planting of forests for harvestable wood, issuance of paper money and increases taxes on his peasantry. He also hired a rice merchant from Kyoto as financial advisor; however none of these measures worked, and in 1868 the domain defaulted on all of its debts, and its peasants rose in revolt. At the time, the domain was 207,400 ryō in debt.

In 1869, the final daimyō, Honjō Michiyoshi, was appointed domain governor under the new Meiji government until the abolition of the han system in 1871.  In 1872, the domain became part of Gifu Prefecture.

Bakumatsu period holdings
As with most domains in the han system, Takatomi Domain consisted of a discontinuous territories calculated to provide the assigned kokudaka, based on periodic cadastral surveys and projected agricultural yields.

Mino Province
2 villages in Kakami District
7 villages in Katagata District
4 villages in Yamagata District
Shimotsuke Province
6 villages in Yanada District

List of daimyōs
  Honjō clan (fudai) 1664–1871

References
The content of this article was largely derived from that of the corresponding article on Japanese Wikipedia.

External links
 Takatomi on "Edo 300 HTML"] 

Domains of Japan
1705 establishments in Japan
History of Gifu Prefecture
Mino Province